Harry & David Field is a baseball park in the northwest United States, located in Medford, Oregon.

Adjacent to U.S. Cellular Community Park (now known as Lithia & Driveway Fields), it hosts youth and high school baseball, primarily the American Legion Medford Mustangs and the Medford Rogues, an independent collegiate wood bat team. Named for the Harry & David Corporation, which has its world headquarters located just south of the ballpark, it was the brainchild of local businessman Gary Miller.

Opened  in 2005, the ballpark replaced the demolished Miles Field, which was about a mile (1.6 km) up Highway 99, now a Walmart. Construction of the ballpark was never completed, and it is off-limits to professional teams under an agreement reached between the stadium and the city, which allows only  amateur baseball and other community events.

It was initially thought that Harry & David Field was a part of the U.S. Cellular Community Park complex, but has been since determined that it is a separate entity.  From 2012 to 2013, the stadium underwent a major renovation and expansion to accommodate the new Medford Rogues. The city's last minor league team, the Southern Oregon Timberjacks of the Class A-Short Season Northwest League, arrived in 1979 as the Medford A's. After 21 seasons at Miles Field, they left in October 1999 for British Columbia and became the Vancouver Canadians.

It is aligned nearly due north (north by east); the recommended orientation (home plate to center field) is east-northeast.

See also
 Nettleton Stadium
 Arcata Ball Park
 Kiger Stadium
 Miles Field demolished in 2005
 Tiger Field
 Appeal-Democrat Park
 Travis Credit Union Park demolished 2008

References

External links
 Medford Parks & Recreation Department website
 Lithia & Driverway Fields website
 Medford Rogues official website

Baseball venues in Oregon
Minor league baseball venues
Buildings and structures in Medford, Oregon
2005 establishments in Oregon
Sports venues completed in 2005